Acianthera bissei is a species of orchid plant native to Cuba.

References 

bissei
Flora of Cuba
Plants described in 1999
Flora without expected TNC conservation status